The Bertone Nuccio is a concept car designed and developed by the Italian design house Bertone to celebrate the company's 100th anniversary.  It was first shown to the public at the 2012 Geneva Motor Show and was the last car designed by Bertone to have the Bertone name, and was the second-last car designed by Bertone before its bankruptcy in 2014.

The two-door Nuccio was designed by Bertone Design Director Michael Robinson and is powered by a mid-mounted  V8 engine.

It is named after Nuccio Bertone, the son of the founder of the Bertone Giovanni Bertone.

References

External links

Nuccio
Bertone vehicles